The Battle of Urica was a battle of the War of Venezuelan Independence, fought in the village of Urica (in modern-day Anzoátegui) on 5 December 1814, between the forces of Republican general in chief José Félix Ribas and Royalist caudillo José Tomás Boves. Although Boves died, the Royalists won the battle.

Prelude 
Shortly after the Battle of the Magueyes, Republican general José Francisco Bermúdez and his defeated army joined Ribas in Maturín. Boves linked up with forces commanded by his lieutenant, Francisco Tomás Morales, in Urica.

Ribas for the Republicans commanded a force of 2,000, including José Tadeo Monagas, Pedro Zaraza, Manuel Cedeño, and Francisco Parejo. The Republican force deployed in three columns at dawn on December 5 on a plain near the town of Urica.

The battle 
Boves led the first attack, targeting Bermúdez's column. This attack was repulsed, and heavy artillery fire inflicted casualties on the Royalist forces. Ribas ordered an attack and successfully encircled Boves' column on the Royalist right.

Boves, finding his column surrounded, led an attack by 400 cavalry in an attempt to break the Republican lines, but was killed in the fighting. The remaining unengaged Royalist columns encircled the Republicans, sealing a Royalist victory, although with heavy casualties on both sides.

Aftermath 
Boves' death had far-reaching consequences. He was succeeded by Morales, but in the long run the llaneros he had led joined the Republican cause under the leadership of José Antonio Páez following efforts by the Republican criollo elite to attract mixed-race and lower class Venezuelans to the cause of independence.

References

Bibliography 
 Antonio Núñez Jiménez (1994). A World Aside: Approximation to the History of Latin America and the Caribbean. Madrid: Editions of the Tower. .

External links 
 The battle of Urica, Enoriente.com (available broken link in Internet File; see the record and the last version).

See also 
 José Tomás Boves
 Second Republic of Venezuela

Anzoátegui
Urica
December 1814 events
1814 in Venezuela